Youngichthys is an extinct genus of prehistoric sarcopterygians or lobe-finned fish from the Upper Permian comprising a single species, Youngichthys xinghuansis.   The single specimen of the fish was discovered in Zhejiang Province, China in 1981.

See also

 Sarcopterygii
 List of sarcopterygians
 List of prehistoric bony fish

References

Prehistoric lobe-finned fish genera
Monotypic fish genera
Fossils of China
Permian bony fish